Be-Reham is a 1980 Indian Hindi-language film directed by Raghunath Jhalani and produced by K. D. Shorey. It stars Sanjeev Kumar, Mala Sinha, Shatrughan Sinha, Reena Roy in lead roles and music by Laxmikant-Pyarelal. This film was remade as Thiruppam in Tamil and Chattaniki Veyi Kallu in Telugu with Super Star Krishna in double role.

Cast
 Sanjeev Kumar as Police Commissioner Kumar Anand
 Mala Sinha as Maya / Devki Bai
 Shatrughan Sinha as Inspector Chandramohan Sharma "Chander"
 Reena Roy as Kiran
 I. S. Johar as Inspector Malpani
 Kader Khan as P. K.
 Viju Khote as Tiger
 Keshto Mukherjee as Ram Prasad
 Manmohan as Ghanshyam
 Urmila Bhatt as Chandramohan's Mother
 Moushumi Chatterjee as Hameeda Banu Bhopali (Special Appearance)
Raj Mehra as Police Commissioner Kulkarni (Guest Role)
Dev Kumar as Police Commissioner Gupte  (Guest Role)
 Helen as P. K.'s Client (Special Appearance)
M. B. Shetty as Shetty 
Viju Khote as Tiger
Gurbachan Singh as Daciat Vikram Singh

Soundtrack
Lyrics: Verma Malik

External links

1980s Hindi-language films
1980 films
Films scored by Laxmikant–Pyarelal